N52 may refer to:

Roads
 Route nationale 52, in France
 N52 road (Ireland)
 Kalinga–Cagayan Road, in the Philippines
 Nebraska Highway 52, in the United States

Other uses
 N52 (Long Island bus)
 BMW N52, an automobile engine
 , a submarine of the Royal Navy
 , a minelayer of the Royal Norwegian Navy
 Nostromo SpeedPad n52, a computer gaming peripheral
 Okamura N-52, a Japanese sport aircraft